Kwabena Kwakye Anti was a lecturer and a Ghanaian politician. He was a minister of state in the Second Republic of Ghana.

Early life and education
Kwabena was born on 23 November 1923 at Akim Awisa near Akim Oda in the Eastern Region.

His early formative years began at Awisa Presbyterian School and Saltpond English Church Mission School where he completed in 1937. He had his secondary education at Mfantsipim School from 1939 to 1943 and Achimota School from 1945 to 1946. In 1950 he enrolled at University of Leeds and graduated in 1954 with a bachelor of Commerce with emphasis on Local Government. In 1959, he enrolled at the University of Colorado graduating with a master of business administration in 1960.

Career
He taught at the Kumasi University of Science and Technology between 1954 and 1959. On his return he worked at the Development Secretariat and rose to the rank of Chief Industrial Promotions Officer.

Politics
During the Second Republic of Ghana, from 1969 to 1972 he was elected member of parliament for Birim-Anafo. He was appointed Minister for Local Government from 1969 until 1971.

Personal life
He was married with four children.

See also
Busia government
Minister for Local Government (Ghana)

References

1923 births
Year of death unknown
Progress Party (Ghana) politicians
Ghanaian MPs 1969–1972
People from Eastern Region (Ghana)
Mfantsipim School alumni
Alumni of Achimota School
Alumni of the University of Leeds
University of Colorado alumni
Academic staff of Kwame Nkrumah University of Science and Technology
Ghanaian expatriates in the United Kingdom
Ghanaian expatriates in the United States